Amicale FC (for sponsorship reasons also Digicel Amicale FC) was an association football club from Port Vila, Vanuatu. They played in the highest level in Vanuatu, the Premia Divisen and played in the continental OFC Champions League. The club has reached and lost the finals of the 2010–11 and 2013–14 OFC Champions League, both times against Auckland City. They were sponsored by Digicel Vanuatu and Hyundai Motor Company.

In August 2019, the club disbanded due to a fine of 6,000 Swiss francs imposed by FIFA in connection with the FIFA Transfer Matching System.

Honours 
Vanuatu National Soccer League: 4
2010, 2011, 2012, 2015

Port Vila Premier League (Regional): 6
2009–10, 2010–11, 2011–12, 2012–13, 2013–14, 2014–15

Performance in OFC competitions 
OFC Champions League: 6 appearances
2010–11: Finalist
2011–12: Group stage
2012–13: Semi-final
2013–14: Finalist
2014–15: Group stage
2015–16: Group stage

Staff

Former players 
  Sanni Issa
  Mauro Boerchio
  Marco Nasali
  Francesco Perrone
  Michele-Emanuele Crazia
  Marko Milivojevic
  Ian Hogg
  Scott Gannon
  Diego Benedito Galvão Máximo
  Colin Marshall
  Adam Dickinson
  Miguel Angel Magnoni
  Gaspar Félix Lezcano
  Carlo Polli
  Osea Vakatalesau

Former Coaches 
  Marco Banchini
  Mauro Bertoni

Notes 

 
Football clubs in Vanuatu
Port Vila